Inusual is the 23rd studio album and the 24th album by Mexican pop singer Yuri. It was released on May 22, 2010 on Warner Music. The album was produced by Scott Erickson. The album made it to number one in Mexico in the first week after its release. The album includes 8 new songs and 5 covers. In less than a month it became a gold album in Mexico.

Track listing

Production
 A production directed and carried out by Scott Erickson to Warner Music México
 Arrangements, programming and recording: Scott Erickson
 Production manager: Cristina Abaroa
 Recording studios: SongLee Studio, LA CANADA, CA
 Assistant mixing engineer: Rafa Sardina
 Mix Studios: Afterhours, Woodland Hills, CA
 Mixing Assistant: Basilio Ramírez
 Voice of Yuri produced by: Scott Erickson and Alejandro Abaroa
 Recording of vocals and backing vocals: Scott Erickson, José Portilla and Juan Carlos Moguel in: Honky Tonk Studios
 Recording assistants: Roberto de la Peña Flores and José Luis del Hoyo
 Mastering by Tom Baker at Precision Mastering
 Musicians: Scott Erickson (Piano / Keyboards) Tim Pierce & Michael Thompson (Electric and acoustic guitars) George Doering (electric sitar) Lee Sklar (Bass) Charlie Morgan (Drums) Chris Bleth (Shehani) Assa Drori (Concertmaster)Assa Drori & Associates (Strings)
 Backing vocals: Yuri, Alejandro Abaroa, Laura Alavarez, Francis Benítez, Rene Sánchez Ramos, Alex Zepeda and Scott Erickson
 Arrangements and programming "Por ti" and "Tú eres para mí": Alex Zepeda
 References to piano for demos: Samuel Mallar
 Transcripts and Music Prep: Cristina Abaroa
 Photo: Uriel Santana
 Production of photo shoot: Verania Pérez
 Participants: Hugo Serna and Juan Carlos Martinez
 Art design: Satoshi Garibay Onodera
 Concept and production of costume: Yamily Valenzuela Canseco
 Make-up: Javier de la Rosa
 Styling: Ignacio Muñoz
 Styling Assistant: Germán Anzures
 Accessories Coordinator: Gustavo Elguerra
 Wizard of accessories: Inés Briones
 Yuri's personal assistant: Jorge Pavez Peso

Singles
 Arrepentida
 Estoy cansada

Others songs
In addition to the promotion of "Inusual", Yuri recorded two songs for two television series, one Mexican and other Chilean

References

2010 albums
Yuri (Mexican singer) albums